The Sàr Ghàidheal Fellowships are an annual award given by the Gaelic college Sabhal Mòr Ostaig to people who have made exceptional contributions to the Scottish Gaelic Language.

Award winners

2015

2014

2013

2012Butt to Barra District News 25/10/12

2011

2010

2009

See also
Scottish Gaelic Awards

References

Scottish awards
Scottish Gaelic language